Samuel or Sam Hunt may refer to:

Samuel Hunt (actor) (born 1986), American actor
Samuel Hunt (New Hampshire politician) (1765–1807), American congressman
Wally Hunt (Samuel Walter Hunt, 1909–1963), English footballer and cricketer
Sam Hunt (Washington politician) (born 1942), member of the Washington House of Representatives
Sam Hunt (poet) (born 1946), New Zealand poet
Sam Hunt (American football) (born 1951), American football linebacker
Sam Hunt (Australian footballer) (born 1983), Australian rules footballer
Sam Hunt (born 1984), American singer and songwriter
Samuel Furman Hunt (1844–1907), American judge and legislator from Cincinnati
R. Samuel Hunt (born 1941), American politician and businessman

See also
Samantha Hunt (born 1971), American novelist
 Hunt (disambiguation)